This is a list of butterflies of Wake Island and the Johnston Atoll.

Nymphalidae

Nymphalinae
Hypolimnas bolina rarik von Eschscholtz, 1821

References
W.John Tennent: A checklist of the butterflies of Melanesia, Micronesia, Polynesia and some adjacent areas. Zootaxa 1178: 1-209 (21 Apr. 2006)

Wake Island and Johnston Atoll
Wake Island and Johnston Atoll